Working Undercover for the Man is an EP by They Might Be Giants, released as an MP3-only album through eMusic. However, 10,000 physical copies were pressed.  The EP is named after their song of the same name, which was later included on Mink Car. The EP is now available on the iTunes Store.

Track listing
"Rest Awhile" - 1:40
"Working Undercover For The Man" - 2:19
"I Am A Human Head" - 2:51
"Empty Bottle Collector" - 1:38
"On The Drag" - 2:18
"Radio They Might Be Giants 1" - 0:09
"Radio They Might Be Giants 2" - 0:16
"Radio They Might Be Giants 3" - 0:12
"Robot Parade (Adult Version)" - 1:05

References

External links
Working Undercover for the Man EP on This Might Be A Wiki
"Working Undercover for the Man" (song) on This Might Be A Wiki

2000 EPs
They Might Be Giants EPs